Sphingomonas adhaesiva is a species of bacteria. Its type strain is JCM 7370 (= GIFU 11458). The cells are rods and it has one polar flagellum. It is aerobic.

References

External links

Type strain of Sphingomonas adhaesiva at BacDive -  the Bacterial Diversity Metadatabase

adhaesiva
Bacteria described in 1990